Chief of General Staff (abbreviated as CGS) is the most coveted position within the Pakistan Army after that of the Chief of Army Staff (COAS). Although four-star Chief of Army Staff (COAS) is the head of the land forces, CGS is "the organisational lead on both intelligence and operations" hence being in charge of the MI (Military Intelligence) and MO (Military Operations) Directorates. Since 1985 a three-star lieutenant general is appointed to the post of CGS.

History 

The selection for Chief of Army Staff (COAS) and Chairman Joint Chiefs of Staff Committee (CJCSC) have a preference for the officer candidate having served as the Chief of General Staff. Of the last 13 four-star army generals, eight officers had served a tenure as the CGS. Of the five who hadn't, Pervez Musharraf and Ashfaq Parvez Kayani had served as Director General of Military Operations (DGMO), while Ehsan ul Haq had served as Director General of Military Intelligence (DGMI), all two-star postings under the CGS. 

Historically, the Chief of General Staff, in addition to Commander, X Corps have political significance when the army chief wanted to overthrow political leadership. The 1999 Pakistani coup d'état, which brought General Pervez Musharraf to power had active involvement of Lt Gen Muhammad Aziz Khan, then CGS and Lt Gen Mahmud Ahmed, Commander of the X Corps.

Therefore, the army chief essentially appoints his most trusted aides for these two postings before making a routine reshuffle. Gen Ziauddin Butt, who was nominated by Prime Minister Nawaz Sharif after retiring Pervez Musharraf, passed his first orders to appoint Lt Gen Muhammad Akram as CGS and Lt Gen Salim Haider as Commander, X Corps. But before this order could be conveyed to the rest of the army, Aziz and Mahmud took steps to reverse the order by overthrowing the government and thus essentially starting the 1999 coup.

List of Chiefs of General Staff

See also
 Vice Chief of Army Staff (Pakistan)

Notes 
1.Later promoted to Lieutenant General in-office.

2.Later promoted to the post of a General.

3.Later promoted to Chairman Joint Chief of Staff Committee.

References

External links
Official Pakistan Army website

Pakistan Army
Pakistan Army appointments